English singer-songwriter, musician, model and actor Harry Styles has written tracks on all three of his studio albums — Harry Styles (2017), Fine Line (2019) and Harry’s House (2022) — and for an assortment of other artists. He has majority of shares in most of his songwriting credits.

After co-writing several songs on the One Direction albums Up All Night and Take Me Home, Styles worked with Savan Kotecha and Carl Falk to write "Happily", and Gary Lightbody of Snow Patrol and Jacknife Lee to write "Something Great", both of which appeared on Midnight Memories. On this album, Styles also co-wrote the hit single Story of My Life, which peaked at number two on the UK Singles Chart, and sold over three million copies in the US. Styles co-wrote the song "Just a Little Bit of Your Heart" with Johan Carlsson which was included on Ariana Grande's second studio album My Everything (2014). Grande went on to perform the song at the 57th Annual Grammy Awards as a then first-time nominee. 

Styles also co-wrote the song "I Love You" with Carlsson which was recorded by Alex & Sierra for their debut studio album. He co-wrote several songs on Four including "Where Do Broken Hearts Go", "Stockholm Syndrome", and hit single Night Changes. He also contributed to several songs on Made in the A.M. including the second single "Perfect", which peaked at number two on the UK Singles Chart. Styles co-wrote the song "Someday" with Meghan Trainor which was recorded by Trainor and Michael Bublé for the latter's Grammy nominated ninth studio album, Nobody but Me (2016). With Jack Antonoff and Ilsey Juber, Styles co-wrote "Alfie's Song (Not So Typical Love Song)", released as a single by Bleachers, for the soundtrack of the film Love, Simon (2018).

Styles worked with Jeff Bhasker, Mitch Rowland, Alex Salibian, Tyler Johnson, and Ryan Nasci on his first album, including the lead single "Sign of the Times", which peaked at number one on the UK Singles Chart and sold over two million copies in the US. 

For his second studio album, Styles partnered with longtime friend and standout producer Thomas Hull, who also had a small role in his debut record, as well as former collaborators Johnson, Rowland, and Bhasker. The record's first single, "Lights Up," peaked at number three on the UK Singles Chart. Another Fine Line single was Styles’ first Billboard Hot 100 number one hit "Watermelon Sugar", earning him his first Grammy Award and second Brit Award. Styles and Kid Harpoon were nominated for Songwriter of the Year at the UK’s prestigious Ivor Novello Awards in 2021, which celebrate the country’s great songwriting and composing talents. Another Fine Line single, "Adore You", was named most performed song at the ceremony.

Aside from the aforementioned artists, Styles has written for bands Augustana and Kodaline, as well as singer Gavin DeGraw. He's collaborated with OneRepublic lead singer Ryan Tedder, EGOT recipient John Legend, and Snow Patrol pianist Johnny McDaid. Colleagues of Styles have indicated that he's composed music with Taylor Swift, Bruno Mars, and Max Martin, though no works have been registered as of yet.

Songs

Notes

References 

 
Styles, Harry, List of songs written by